Zaka Alao (born August 15, 1981 in Paris, France) is a French basketball player who played 29 games for French Pro A league club Limoges during the 2003-2004 season.

References

1981 births
Living people
French men's basketball players
Basketball players from Paris